Enekbatus dualis is a shrub endemic to Western Australia.

Description
It blooms in September producing pink flowers.

Distribution
It is found on low hills and slopes and among rocky outcrops in the Mid West region of Western Australia between Geraldton and Yalgoo, Western Australia where it grows in sandy-clay soils over granite.

References

dualis
Endemic flora of Western Australia
Myrtales of Australia
Rosids of Western Australia
Endangered flora of Australia
Plants described in 2010
Taxa named by Barbara Lynette Rye
Taxa named by Malcolm Eric Trudgen